

Brands and enterprises 
 OneBelow (Also written as "One Below"), a British variety store founded in 2018 by Chris Edwards

People 
 One Be Lo or One Below, an American hip-hop rap artist